St. Peter's Hospital  may refer to:

Canada
St. Peter's Hospital (Hamilton) in Hamilton, Ontario

United Kingdom
St Peter's Hospital, Bristol, in Bristol
St Peter's Hospital, Chertsey, an NHS district general hospital in Chertsey, Surrey, England
St Peter's Hospital, Covent Garden, a former hospital in London

United States
St. Peter's Hospital (Albany, New York), a hospital in New York State
St. Peter's Hospital (Brooklyn), former hospital in New York City
St. Peter's Hospital (Helena, Montana), a hospital in Montana
Providence St. Peter Hospital, Olympia, Washington, also known as St. Peter's Hospital
Saint Peter's University Hospital in New Brunswick, New Jersey